Bithyniidae is a family of small freshwater snails with an operculum, aquatic gastropod molluscs in the clade Littorinimorpha.

Their minute shell is often colored. They are characterized by a calcareous operculum, a lobe on the upper surface of the neck. The ctenidium, the respiratory gill-comb, is very broad. They have a ciliary feeding habit. The kidney has a large extension towards the mantle.

Genera
Genera in the family Bithyniidae include:
 Alocinna Annandale & Prashad, 1919
 Bithynia Leach, 1818 - type genus
 Subgenus Bithynia Leach, 1818
 Subgenus Codiella Locard, 1894
  † Celekenia Andrusov, 1902
 Boreoelona Starobogatov & Streletzkaja, 1967
 Congodoma Mandahl-Barth, 1968
 † Daciella Wenz, 1942 
 Digoniostoma Annandale, 1920
 Emmericiopsis Thiele, 1928
 † Euchilus Sandberger, 1870 
 † Ferebithynia Kókay, 2006 
 Funduella Mandahl-Barth, 1968
 Gabbiella Mandahl-Barth, 1968
 Hydrobioides Nevill, 1884
 Incertihydrobia Verdcourt, 1958
 Jubaia Mandahl-Barth, 1968
 Limnitesta Mandahl-Barth, 1974
 Myosorella Annandale, 1919
 Neosataria Kulkarni & Khot, 2015
 Neumayria de Stefani, 1877
 Parabithynia Pilsbry, 1928
 Parafossarulus Annandale, 1924
 Pseudobithynia Glöer & Pešić, 2006
 Pseudovivipara Annandale, 1918
 Sierraia Conolly, 1929
 † Tylopoma Brusina, 1882
 Wattebledia Crosse, 1886
Genera brought into synonymy
 Bithinia Leach, 1818: synonym of Bithynia Leach, 1818
 Bulimus Scopoli, 1777: synonym of Bithynia Leach, 1818
 Bythinia Stein, 1850: synonym of Bithynia Leach, 1818 
 Digyrcidum Locard, 1882: synonym of Bithynia Leach, 1818
 Gabbia Tryon, 1865: synonym of Bithynia (Gabbia) Tryon, 1865 represented as Bithynia Leach, 1818
 Paraelona Beriozkina & Starobogatov, 1994: synonym of Bithynia Leach, 1818

References

 Strong E. E., Gargominy O., Ponder W. F. & Bouchet P. (2008). "Global Diversity of Gastropods (Gastropoda; Mollusca) in Freshwater". Hydrobiologia 595: 149-166.

External links 
 Worldwide Mollusk Species Database: Bithyniidae

 
Taxa named by John Edward Gray